Carbon is a 2022 Indian Tamil-language action thriller film written and directed by R. Srinuvasan and produced by Benchmark Films. The film stars Vidharth and Dhanya Balakrishna in the lead roles. This marks the 25th film for Vidharth. The film's music is composed by Sam C. S., with cinematography handled by Vivekanand Santhosham and editing done by Praveen K. L. The film released in theatres on 13 January 2022.

Cast

Production 
Benchmark Films signed on director R. Srinuvasan (who earlier directed Annadurai) to direct a film for their production house during the middle of 2020, with Vidharth to portray the leading role. The shooting of the film was started in August 2020 with the majority of the portions was shot in Chennai and the remaining portions in Tirukoilur.

Release 
The trailer of the film was released on 4 December 2021. The film got released in theatres on 13 January 2022.

References 

2022 action thriller films
Films scored by Sam C. S.
2020s Tamil-language films
Indian action thriller films